Avvakum is a Russian Christian male first name. The etymology of Habakkuk is opaque, though it has been thought by some to derive from the Hebrew root  "embrace", in which case the meaning might be (God's) embrace. Alternately, the name is possibly related to the Akkadian khabbaququ, the name of a fragrant plant. Abakum is a variant of this first name. Other variants include Old Church Slavonic Amvakum, literary Ambakum, and colloquial forms Obakum, Bakum, and Bakun. The diminutives of "Avvakum" include Avvakumka and Avvakusha, while the diminutives of "Abakum" are Abakumka and Abasha.

The patronymics derived from "Avvakum" are "" (Avvakumovich; masculine) and its colloquial form "" (Avvakumych), and "" (Avvakumovna; feminine). The patronymics derived from "Abakum" are "" (Abakumovich; masculine) and its colloquial form "" (Abakumych), and "" (Abakumovna; feminine).

Last names Abakumov, Abakishin, Abakulov, Abakumkin, Abakushin, Abakshin, Abbakumov, Avakumov, Avvakumov, and possibly Bakulin and Bakunin all derive from this first name.

References